The Churo is a river in Buryatia, southern East Siberia, Russia. It is a tributary of the Upper Angara river of the Angara - Baikal basin. There are no settlements by the river.

The Baikal–Amur Mainline runs near the confluence of the Churo and the Upper Angara.

Course
The Churo is a right tributary of the Upper Angara River. Its sources are in an unnamed alpine lake of the western area of the Delyun-Uran Range. In its upper course it flows first southwestwards then westwards across a swampy valley. After bending southwards, its course marks the eastern limit of the Upper Angara Range. Finally, after meandering in a floodplain with lakes, it meets the Upper Angara  from its mouth in Lake Baikal.

The main tributaries of the Churo are the Avaikan, Uklon, Uanymi and Churokan. The river is frozen between October and May.

See also
List of rivers of Russia

References

Rivers of Buryatia
Stanovoy Highlands